Drážovce is a village and municipality in the Krupina District of the Banská Bystrica Region of Slovakia.

History
The village is first mentioned in Bzovík abbey's list in 1135 (1135 Dras, 1286 Daras, 1349 Darassy, 1394 Vduarnokdaras, 1511 Daras utraque). It belonged to Hont Castle. In 1296 it was given to a certain Arnold from Banská Štiavnica, and from the 16th century it changed many owners: the local feudatory family Dárázsy, Dalmady, Jessenszky (18th century), Radvanszky and Sembery (another local family).

Genealogical resources

The records for genealogical research are available at the state archive "Statny Archiv in Banska Bystrica, Slovakia"

 Roman Catholic church records (births/marriages/deaths): 1760-1897 (parish B)
 Lutheran church records (births/marriages/deaths): 1730-1896 (parish A)

See also
 List of municipalities and towns in Slovakia

References

External links
 
http://www.e-obce.sk/obec/drazovce/drazovce.html
View on Terraserver
Surnames of living people in Drazovce

Villages and municipalities in Krupina District